Jujutsu Kaisen is an anime television series based on the manga series of the same name by Gege Akutami. The series adaptation was announced in the 52nd issue of Weekly Shōnen Jump published on November 25, 2019. The story follows high school student Yuji Itadori as he joins a secret organization of Jujutsu Sorcerers in order to kill a powerful Curse named Ryomen Sukuna, of whom Yuji becomes the host.

The series was produced by MAPPA and directed by Sunghoo Park. Hiroshi Seko wrote the scripts to every episode, Tadashi Hiramatsu designed the characters, and Hiroaki Tsutsumi, Yoshimasa Terui and Alisa Okehazama composed the music. While the anime had an advanced streaming debut on September 19, 2020, it officially aired on MBS and TBS's Super Animeism block from October 3, 2020, to March 27, 2021. The series ran for 24 episodes.

The first opening theme, "Kaikai Kitan", is performed by Eve, while the first ending theme, "Lost in Paradise feat. AKLO", is performed by ALI. From episode 3 onwards the series includes post-credits anime shorts titled , which focus on the daily lives of the main characters. The second opening theme is "Vivid Vice", performed by Who-ya Extended, while the second ending theme is "Give it Back", performed by Cö Shu Nie.

The anime is licensed by Crunchyroll for streaming outside of Asia. Crunchyroll has released dubs for the series in English, Spanish, Portuguese, French and German, in addition to a Russian voice-over stream that premiered on November 20, 2020. In Southeast Asia, Medialink licensed the series and streamed it on iQIYI. The first Japanese DVD and Blu-ray volumes was released on January 20, 2021.

On February 12, 2022, a second season was announced. It is set to premiere in July 2023.



Series overview

Episode list

Season 1 (2020–21)

Season 2 (2023)

Home media release
Japan

North America

Notes

References

External links
 Jujutsu Kaisen at Crunchyroll
 

Jujutsu Kaisen